Dad and Dave: On Our Selection is an Australian comedy film, based on the characters and writings of author Steele Rudd. It is set in late nineteenth century colonial Queensland, but largely filmed in Braidwood, New South Wales. The stories of the Rudds have been previously adapted for radio, television and film; this film is a remake of a silent film from 1920. Geoffrey Atherden contributed to the screenplay. The film featured well-known actors like Ray Barrett and Barry Otto.

"Dad" and "Mum" Rudd were played by veteran actor Leo McKern and opera singer Dame Joan Sutherland in her only feature film role. The theme music was sung by Australian country musician John Williamson.

Plot summary
The film portrays the Rudd family of 'Aussie battlers' in late 19th-century colonial Australia; Dad and Mother Rudd, and their hardworking but somewhat dull son Dave. They take up a selection of land and attempt to farm it. The difficulties of the early colonial farming life are portrayed, with its ups and downs, humour and frustrations.

Finally tired of local corruption and the harshness of his life, Dad Rudd decides to run for State Parliament.

Cast
 Leo McKern – Dad (Joseph) Rudd
 Joan Sutherland – Mother (Ellen) Rudd
 Geoffrey Rush – Dave Rudd
 Ray Barrett – Dwyer
 Barry Otto – J P Riley
 Noah Taylor – Joe Rudd
 Robert Menzies – Cranky Jack
 Essie Davis – Kate Rudd
 Celia Ireland- Sarah Rudd

Reception
The movie was made to honour Australia's centenary of film and cinema. Despite a cast of well-known actors and actresses, it was not well received.

Rob Lowing, film critic for The Sydney Morning Herald rated the movie three stars out of four. Lowing described the film as "enormous fun" and praised the production values as "impeccable".

Box office
Dad and Dave: On Our Selection grossed $1,222,051 at the box office in Australia,.

Home media
Dad and Dave: On Our Selection was released on DVD by Umbrella Entertainment in May 2006. The DVD is compatible with all region codes and includes special features such as the original theatrical trailer, unique Umbrella Entertainment trailers, a stills and poster gallery, TV spots, a behind the scenes making-of featurette and on-set footage and interviews with cast and crew.

The original soundtrack has been released twice on CD. First by EMI Records in 1995 with dialogue excerpts, and then reissued in 2002 in a limited Collector's Edition by Australian film music recording archivist, Philip Powers, on the 1M1 Records label. The re-issue was without dialogue and contained a 19-minute medley of the songs.

See also
Cinema of Australia

References

External links 
 
 
Dad and Dave On Our Selection at Oz Movies
 http://www.fionalake.com.au/other-info/other-references/music-films-books/on-our-selection-film
 

Films set in Australia
Australian comedy films
1995 comedy films
1995 films
Films shot in Australia
Films based on works by Steele Rudd
Films produced by Bruce Davey
Films set in 1899
Icon Productions films
Roadshow Entertainment films
1990s English-language films
1990s Australian films
English-language comedy films